Sarasinula dubia is a species of air-breathing land slug, a terrestrial pulmonate gastropod mollusk in the family Veronicellidae, the leatherleaf slugs.

Distribution
Distribution of Sarasinula dubia include:
 Mexico
 Brazil

References

Veronicellidae
Gastropods described in 1885